Sustagen is a nutritional supplement beverage brand, available in both ready-to-drink and powdered form, manufactured by the food science division of Nestle, and  includes products for those with special dietary requirements for example, gluten-free, low lactose, high fibre, high protein or with added probiotics. The Nestle food science division also manufactures the Optifast Nutritional line, which includes weight-loss shakes.

Mascots
Susy and Geno were mascots in Sustagen as a child form in mid-late 1980s until late 1990s. Later, they were revived twice, in 2008 (soft revived) and as an adult form in 2013.

Varieties
The product comes in five varieties:
Sustagen Ready To Drink: pre-mixed with milk and sold in a Tetra Pak in four flavours: Dutch Chocolate, Mega Choc, French Vanilla and Mocha Choc.
Sustagen Ready To Mix: in powdered form for mixing with milk or water. Sold in a can in three flavours: Dutch Chocolate, French Vanilla and Mocha Choc.
Sustagen Sport: special sport formulation, sold in powdered form for mixing with milk or water. Sold in a can in two flavours: Chocolate and Vanilla. Extremely high in protein. 
Sustagen Hospital Formula: special hospital formulation, sold in powdered form for mixing with milk or water. Sold in three different varieties: Chocolate, Vanilla and an unflavoured neutral.
Sustagen Plus Fibre: special hospital formulation with added dietary fibre, sold in powdered form for mixing with milk or water. Sold in a can in two flavours: Chocolate and Vanilla.

Media references
Sustagen received a publicity boost when, on the advice of a nutritionist, it was one of the items sent through a pipe to trapped miners Brant Webb and Todd Russell in the 2006 Beaconsfield mine collapse. Russell, however, later joked to Eddie McGuire: "That Sustagen, I wouldn't feed it to my dog." Referring to the fact that they received the hospital grade version of the product, which is more nutritious.
Sustagen, in 2006 initialised a sponsorship deal with the Austereo radio network, (the forerunner of what is now Southern Cross Austereo) in Australia that promoted the brand on podcasts of the network's radio programmes.

References

External links
Sustagen website

Non-alcoholic drinks
Dietary supplements
Energy drinks
Drink companies of Australia